Henry Andersen (1926-1999) also known as Henry 'Stompa' Andersen was a former speedway rider from Norway.

Speedway career 
Andersen was a former champion of Norway, winning the Norwegian Championship in 1950. 

He reached the final of the Speedway World Championship in the 1955 Individual Speedway World Championship. He was also the 1955 European champion.

Individual World Championship
 1955 -  London, Wembley Stadium - 15th - 2pts

References 

Norwegian speedway riders